Laba Forest is a protected forest in Burkina Faso. 
It is located in Sanguié Province.

The estimate terrain elevation above sea level is 260 metre.

References

Protected areas of Burkina Faso
Sanguié Province